Irizarry is a Basque family name from Northern Spain and Southern France. It is especially associated with Puerto Rico.  Notable people with the surname include:

 Anibal Irizarry, Puerto Rican soldier, recipient of the Distinguished Service Cross during World War II
 Aníbal González Irizarry (1927–2018), Puerto Rican educator, journalist and news broadcaster
 Carlos Irizarry Yunqué (born 1922), Puerto Rican judge
 Dora Irizarry (born 1955), American judge
 Edwin Irizarry Mora (born 1961), Puerto Rican economist, professor and politician
 Guillermo Irizarry (born 1916), Puerto Rican statesman, economist and agronomist
 Janina Irizarry (born 1983), Puerto Rican singer
 Orlando Irizarry, Puerto Rican beach volleyball player 
 Ramón López Irizarry (1897–1982), Puerto Rican educator and scientist
 Vincent Irizarry (born 1959), American actor
 Wanda Irizarry, Puerto Rican beauty queen